Hugh Edward Canavan (May 13, 1897 – September 4, 1967), nicknamed "Hugo", was a pitcher and outfielder in Major League Baseball.

Playing career
He played for the Boston Braves in 1918, appearing as a pitcher in 11 games and compiling an 0–4 record.  He also appeared as a pinch-hitter in 4 games, and played one full game as an outfielder.  Canavan appeared in a total of 16 games for the Braves; the Braves lost all 16 of those games.

Canavan had a more successful minor league career, where he played mostly as a pitcher with occasional games in the outfield.  Playing nine seasons between 1916 and 1927, as a pitcher Canavan won 99 games.

References

External links

1897 births
1967 deaths
Major League Baseball pitchers
Boston Braves players
Baseball players from Worcester, Massachusetts
Lynn Pipers players
Lawrence Barristers players
Worcester Busters players
Memphis Chickasaws players
Hartford Senators players
Toledo Mud Hens players
Springfield Ponies players
Baltimore Orioles (IL) players
Bridgeport Bears (baseball) players